Bwlch is a village in Wales. Bwlch means a pass in Welsh and may also refer to
A4061 road (locally called Bwlch y Clawdd)
Bwlch Penbarras, a mountain pass in north-east Wales
Bwlchygroes, a village in Pembrokeshire
Bwlch y Groes, a public road mountain pass
Bwlch y Ddwyallt, a high point of the plateau of Gwaun Cerrig Llwydion 
Bwlch-y-Ddeufaen, a mountain pass in Conwy county borough
Bwlch Mawr, a hill in Gwynedd 
Cors Bwlch-y-baedd, a Site of Special Scientific Interest in Ceredigion
Fan Bwlch Chwyth, a peak in Powys
Pen Bwlch Llandrillo, a mountain 
Rhos Bwlch-y-rhandir, a Site of Special Scientific Interest in Ceredigion
Tan-y-Bwlch (disambiguation)